Dublin City University Gaelic Athletic Association Club is the GAA club at Dublin City University. The club fields teams in men's Gaelic football,  hurling, ladies' Gaelic football and camogie. It also organises Gaelic handball.
The club mainly competes in intervarsity competitions such as the Sigerson Cup, the Fitzgibbon Cup, the O'Connor Cup and the Ashbourne Cup. DCU has also entered competitions organised by the Leinster GAA, including the O'Byrne Cup,  the Kehoe Cup and Walsh Cup. In 2016 St. Patrick's College, Drumcondra merged with Dublin City University. As a result some DCU GAA teams, especially reserve teams, compete as DCU St Patrick's or DCU Dóchas Éireann.

Football

Sigerson Cup
DCU senior men's Gaelic football team compete in the Sigerson Cup, while the reserve team competes in the Trench Cup. In 2006, with a team that included Conor Mortimer, Bernard Brogan, Seánie Johnston, Declan Lally, Stephen Cluxton, Paul Casey and captained by Bryan Cullen, DCU won the Sigerson Cup for the first time after defeating Queen's University by 0–11 to 1–04 in the final at Parnell Park. Mortimer secured the cup for DCU after scoring three points in the last 15 minutes. In 2010 DCU won the Sigerson Cup  for the second time, after defeating UCC by 1–11 by 0–10. The team was captained by Paddy Andrews and also featured Michael Boyle, Philly McMahon,  Kevin Nolan, Jonny Cooper, Bryan Cullen  David Kelly, Paul Flynn and Cathal Cregg. In 2012 DCU won their third Sigerson Cup title in seven years following a 2–17 to 0–7 win over NUI Maynooth in the final. Dublin trio Paul Flynn, Dean Rock and Eoghan O'Gara scored 1–11 between them. Other members of the team included Michael Boyle, Jonny Cooper, James McCarthy, Colm Begley, Fiontán Ó Curraoin, David Kelly and Michael Murphy. In 2015 Colm Begley captained DCU when they won their fourth Sigerson Cup, defeating UCC by 1–14 to 2–10 after extra time in the final.

Notes

O'Byrne Cup
DCU senior men's Gaelic football team have also competed in the O'Byrne Cup. In 2010 they became the first university team to win the cup.

Ladies' football
O'Connor Cup
DCU senior ladies' Gaelic football team compete in the O'Connor Cup. DCU have also entered reserve teams in the Giles Cup, the Lynch Cup and the Lagan Cup. In 2009, with a team that included Lyndsey Davey,  DCU won the O'Connor Cup for the first time. They subsequently went on to complete a three-in-a-row of O'Connor Cup wins. Other members of the team from this era included Niamh McEvoy and Lindsay Peat. In 2018 Sarah Rowe scored 1–3 as DCU defeated University of Limerick by 2–12 to 0–17 to win the cup for the fourth time.

O'Connor Shield

HEC Ladies Division 1 – O'Rourke Cup
DCU senior ladies' Gaelic football team also compete in the HEC Ladies Division 1. The winners are awarded the O'Rourke Cup.

Giles Cup

Lynch Cup
The DCU senior ladies' team initially found success in the Lynch Cup, winning it in 2004 and 2006 before gaining promotion to the O'Connor Cup.  

Lagan Cup

Hurling
DCU senior hurling team competes in the Fitzgibbon Cup, the Kehoe Cup and the Walsh Cup. DCU have also entered reserve teams in the Ryan Cup.

Kehoe Cup Shield

Notes

Fitzgibbon Cup

Ryan Cup

Fergal Maher Cup

Notes

Camogie
DCU senior camogie team competes in the Ashbourne Cup. DCU have also entered reserve teams in the Purcell Cup.

Purcell Cup

Handball
DCU Gaelic handballers compete in competitions such as the Wexford Intervarsity, the Kilkenny Intervarsity, the Kingscourt Intervarsity and Dublin Leagues. Training takes place in DCU Sports Centre and at CLG Na Fianna.

Notable players

Senior inter-county players

Football
 Dublin

 Mayo

 Roscommon
 Cathal Cregg
 David Keenan
 Donal Shine
 Enda Smith
 Donal Smith

 Donegal
 Michael Boyle
 Brendan McCole
 Martin McElhinney
 Conor Morrison
 Michael Murphy

Ladies' football
  

 Mayo
 Niamh Kelly
 Fiona McHale
 Sarah Rowe
 Aisling Tarpey

 Tipperary
 Aisling Maloney

Hurling
 Dublin
 Eoghan O'Donnell 
 Shane Ryan
 Wexford

 Kilkenny
 Conor Delaney
 John Donnelly
 Evan Shefflin

Handballers
 Derek Henry
 Eoin Kennedy

Ireland internationals
 Men's international rules

 Australian rules football
 John Tierney 
 Shinty–hurling international
 Seán Óg Ó hAilpín
 Women's international rules
 Clíodhna O'Connor
 Women's rugby union
  Lindsay Peat

Honours

Football
 Sigerson Cup 
Winners: 2006, 2010, 2012, 2015 
Runners Up: 2016
O'Byrne Cup 
Winners: 2010, 2012
Runners Up: 2009
Ladies' football
 O'Connor Cup 
Winners: 2009, 2010, 2011, 2018 
Runners Up: 2015
 O'Connor Shield 
Runners Up: 2019
 HEC Ladies Division 1 – O'Rourke Cup 
Winners: 2011, 2012, 2015, 2017 
Runners Up: 2008, 2014, 2019
 Giles Cup 
Winners: 2017 
Runners Up: 2018
 Lynch Cup 
Winners: 2004, 2006, 2015
Runners Up: 2010, 2011
 Lagan Cup 
Runners Up: 2019

Hurling
 Ryan Cup 
Winners: 1998, 2002
 Fergal Maher Cup 
Winners: 1988
 Fitzgibbon Cup 
Runners Up: 2018
 Kehoe Cup Shield 
Runners Up: 2019
Camogie
 Purcell Cup 
Winners: 2012, 2013 
Runners Up: 2011, 2015

References

External links
   DCU GAA on Facebook
   DCU Ladies GAA on Facebook
   DCU Camogie Club on Facebook
   DCU GAA on Twitter
 DCU Ladies GAA on Twitter

 
Gaelic games clubs in Dublin (city)
Gaelic football clubs in Dublin (city)
Hurling clubs in Dublin (city)
Camogie clubs in County Dublin
GAA
University Gaelic games clubs